Art of Revolution is an EP by American electronic music artist Bassnectar, released in 2009 on Amorphous Music.

Track listing

References

2009 EPs
Bassnectar albums